BBC Radio 1's Big Weekend (R1BW) (previously known as One Big Weekend, for 2012 as Radio 1's Hackney Weekend, and for 2018 as BBC Music's Biggest Weekend) is a British music festival run by the BBC's radio station. It is held once a year, in a different location within the United Kingdom each time. It was the biggest free-ticketed music event in Europe, until a fee for tickets was introduced in 2018, and always includes a host of new artists.

Background and history

The festival is a spin-off of Radio 1's "One Big Sunday", where in each Sunday during the summer months a different town would host the roadshow, usually next to a beach or in a large park. These were also free, but non-ticketed and held from 2000 to 2002. Both events are successors to the Radio 1 Roadshow which toured the country during every summer from 1973 and continued throughout the 1990s.

Originally a "One Big Weekend" would run twice a year, although that last happened in 2004. Since 2005 it has been held once a year instead, usually in May, with the exception of 2012 when a larger festival took place over the weekend of 23–24 June in Hackney, East London.

The form of the event has varied over the years, from one tent at the events in 2003 to as many as six stages in 2012. Every event since 2013 has consisted of one outdoor main stage, one tented second stage, and one much smaller stage dedicated to showcasing emerging talent supported by BBC Introducing. Additionally, the early events dedicated their Saturday exclusively to dance music and their Sunday to bands. The dance day was replaced by a second day of bands from 2006 onwards, although there was a dance-orientated ‘Outdoor Stage’ between 2007 and 2012. The ‘dance day’ was effectively reinstated for the 2013 event in Northern Ireland, with a day of electronic music being held on the Friday of the weekend. This approach has been repeated in most years since.

The next edition of the event was scheduled to be held between 22 and 24 May 2020 in Dundee, with Camperdown Park becoming the first site to host the event twice. The event however was cancelled in reaction to the COVID-19 pandemic and went virtual. The 2021 Big Weekend was also moved into a virtual mode. 

In late 2021, it was revealed that Radio 1's Big Weekend would return in a live tradition for the first time in three years, with Coventry being the host city for this event on 27 to 29 May 2022.

On 30 January 2023, it was announced that Dundee would host Big Weekend from 26 to 28 May 2023. The city was originally due to host in 2020 but it was cancelled due to the COVID-19 pandemic.

Venues

Notes

Tickets
Tickets to the festival are, notably, free (except the small booking fee which was introduced from the 2012 event onwards) but are usually now restricted to one pair per person. Prior to 2006, a ticket booth would be set up in an easy location in the centre of the hosting city, and anybody who wished to obtain a pair of tickets would queue up, before a Radio 1 DJ gave them out (pairs of tickets for the Saturday given away on a Saturday and on the following day for the Sunday), on a first-come first-served basis. The theory there was that the majority of tickets would go to local residents, as people from further away would not make the journey. However, as more and more 'non-local' residents came to the giveaways, and the capacity at the events grew year-on-year, it was decided that a different system was needed. From 2006, therefore, pairs of tickets have been given away through an online lottery. People wishing to attend register on the BBC Radio 1 website and pairs of tickets are then randomly allocated and given out. In order to make sure that those who live locally get the majority of tickets, the applications are split into categories of 'local postcodes' and 'other postcodes' and the majority of the tickets (usually 95%) are reserved for the former.

Despite the tickets being free, some people often attempt to sell them on eBay, and in recent years this has meant that various security measures have been introduced, most notably the barcodes on tickets which are scanned at the gate, the rule that the person whose name is registered on the ticket has to be in attendance and, from 2012, passport-style pictures being required as part of the application process. Tickets are also given away as prizes via various competitions held on Radio 1 (and now 1Xtra) in the weeks running up to the event, which is usually the only way in which members of the public can obtain passes for both days of the event. For the 2013 event, no pre-registration was necessary, and instead all tickets were given away on a 'first come first served' basis - albeit still with the skewing of 90% of tickets being held back for residents of Northern Ireland. After an initial 24-hour delay due to technical difficulties, the tickets all sold out within an hour. 2014's event in Glasgow saw the 'first come first served' ticket release return with no pre-registration needed. 50% of tickets were reserved for residents within the boundaries of Glasgow City Council with a further 45% reserved for those in the rest of Scotland. However, for the first time ever, members of the public could obtain tickets to all three days of the festival. This led to complaints from some disappointed fans who were left without tickets to any day while others bagged tickets for the entire weekend.

For the 2006 event in Dundee, less than half of the tickets were given to local residents, and allegations were made of postal workers stealing tickets.

2000s

May 2003
On 3 and 4 May, the One Big Weekend was held in Manchester.

September 2003
On 13 and 14 September, the One Big Weekend held in Cardiff.

April 2004
On 24 and 25 April 2004, the first of two in that calendar year - was held at Prehen Fields, Derry. It featured the following line-up:

Line-up
Saturday 24 April

Sunday 25 April

September 2004
On 18 and 19 September 2004, the final 'One Big Weekend' under that name - and the second of that calendar year - was held at Perry Park, Birmingham. It featured the following line-up:

Line-up
Saturday 18 September

Sunday 19 September

2005
On 7 and 8 May 2005, the Big Weekend was held at Penshaw Monument in Herrington Country Park, Sunderland, and featured artists included:

Line-up
Saturday 7 May

Sunday 8 May

2006
In 2006, the Big Weekend was held in Camperdown Park, Dundee on 13 and 14 May 2006 and featured artists which included:

Line-up
Saturday 13 May

Sunday 14 May

Many of the BBC Radio 1 DJs including Pete Tong, Tim Westwood and Chris Moyles attended too, and held a number of competitions so that people could win tickets. In addition, Radio 1 also created a virtual festival experience in the virtual reality application Second Life. Avatars on the BBC Radio 1 islands could watch the event on live screens while the audience could see their virtual counterparts on massive stage side screens at the real event in Dundee. The event was hailed as the first ever festival with a professional line-up to take place in a virtual universe.

2007
On Saturday 19 May and Sunday 20 May, Radio 1's Big Weekend was held in Moor Park in Preston.

For the first time in the history of the event, all tickets had barcodes and were scanned on arrival at the park. The barcodes contained information such as name and address of the winner of the tickets.  Having the barcodes meant that Radio 1 could cancel lost or stolen tickets and issue new ones to those affected.  In an effort to stop people buying tickets from eBay or through other mediums, the public was told they would be asked to prove their home address if their tickets were thought to be suspect.  However, the BBC decided to scrap this idea on the day as they thought it would cause angry scenes if people were to be turned away.

At the close of entry on 8 May 2007, over 450,000 people registered for a chance to get tickets for the 2007 festival. On Tuesday 8 May on The Chris Moyles Show, Chris announced that a further 5,000 tickets will be available taking the total for both days being 35,000.

Tickets were also given away in an alternate reality game online using Radio 1 fan forums. The situation surrounded a man called Paul Denchfield who was supposedly sacked from the station. Throughout the run up to the event 'Frozen Indigo Angel' would appear in various places online and on-air, with it being the player's mission to hunt down tickets.

The line up was as follows:

Line-up
Saturday 19 May

Sunday 20 May

2008 
In 2008, the festival was held over the weekend of Saturday 10 May and Sunday 11 May, at Mote Park in Maidstone, which can hold up to 20,000 people. 85% of tickets went to people living in Kent, 10% went to those living in areas bordering Kent, including parts of Sussex, Surrey, Essex and London, and the other 5% were handed to others living across the United Kingdom. Concern was raised after a large number of locals commented that even those living within the close vicinity of the park did not receive tickets, with some in the Medway towns winning multiple times.

Line-up
The full line-up (except for Paramore) was announced on BBC Radio 1 on Monday 21 April 2008.

Saturday 10 May

Sunday 11 May

The national newspapers had also reported that Justin Timberlake could be a special guest - performing with Madonna. Although this later turned out to be untrue. Pendulum were hailed as one of the festivals' best acts, outshining even Madonna and packing the INMWT tent.

 On the main stage on 10 May 2008, Paul Schrader, Chris Carmack and Rachel McAdams appeared whilst doing promotional work for Tarzan.

Headline sets

2009 
The 2009 event was held in Swindon.

Line-up
Saturday 9 May

Sunday 10 May

2010s

2010 
On 24 February 2010, it was announced on The Chris Moyles Show that the 10th Big Weekend would take place on the Faenol Estate near Bangor, Wales on Saturday 22 May and Sunday 23 May 2010. Pixie Lott also performed on the show and was announced as the first act on the bill and Lostprophets was announced while they were on tour. Jaguar Skills announced on his website that he would be playing at the event, but he was not on the announced line-up. On the morning of 26 April 2010, the full main stage and INMWT stage listings were announced during the Fearne Cotton Show (which was hosted by Annie Mac, as Cotton was on vacation).

20,000 pairs of free tickets were made available to the public for each day of the weekend. Applicants were able to register for tickets to the event on the Radio 1 website from 26 April 2010 until 3 May 2010.

Line-up
Saturday 22 May

Sunday 23 May

Live Lounge Tent

2011
The announcement of location and dates for Radio 1's Big Weekend 2011 was made by Scott Mills on 30 March 2011, with his breakfast show (he was covering for Chris Moyles that week) being broadcast from Trinity School, Carlisle that morning. Over 750,000 people applied for tickets to the event.

20,000 pairs of tickets were available for the two-day event with the usual allocation policy applying. It was announced that the priority areas for tickets would be the borders of Carlisle, Cumbria, the Scottish Borders and the North East of England.

As usual, competitions to win VIP tickets were run on various Radio 1 shows in the weeks leading up to the Big Weekend.

Line-up

Headline sets

TV & radio coverage
Radio 1's Big Weekend 2011 was streamed live on the Radio 1 website. The headliners of each day (Foo Fighters and Lady Gaga on Saturday and Sunday respectively) were broadcast live on BBC Three and BBC HD. The Big Weekend was also broadcast live on BBC Radio 1. Highlights of the event were also broadcast on BBC Three and BBC HD during the week following the Big Weekend.

2012
On 23 May 2011, it was announced that for 2012, Radio 1 would be replacing the Big Weekend with a 'Hackney Weekend' to form part of the London 2012 Festival, in the buildup to the 2012 Olympics.
The festival duly took place on the Hackney Marshes over the weekend of 23 and 24 June 2012.

50,000 people attended each of the two days in 2012, meaning a total of 100,000 people visited the site over the weekend: more than double the previous highest attendances (40,000 across the weekends in each of 2010 and 2011). Due to the upgraded scale of the festival, the number of stages were increased (from four to six) and, for the first time, the Main Stage was outdoors rather than inside a tent.

Florence + The Machine were initially announced as playing on Saturday 23 June, but a double booking at another European festival meant that they actually performed on Sunday 24 June.

The Ting Tings were initially announced as to be playing on Saturday 23 June, but due to logistical reasons beyond their control they had to pull out of the bill.

On both days of the festival, a number of unannounced special guests performed with artists on the bill, the most noteworthy of which were Rihanna, M.I.A. and Kanye West appearing as part of Jay-Z's headlining set on Saturday; and, in turn, Jay-Z went on to return the favour and make a special multiple-song contribution during Rihanna's own headlining set the next day.

Line-up
Saturday 23 June

Headline sets

2013
The new Radio 1 Breakfast Show host Nick Grimshaw announced that the Big Weekend would return to Derry in May 2013 to celebrate its title of UK City of Culture 2013, the same city that hosted the first of the two 2004 Big Weekends (although the actual site is different). For the first time, the Big Weekend extended to a third day - which focused on dance music. Alongside that initial announcement were the confirmation of the first two acts, Olly Murs and Two Door Cinema Club, with the rest of the line-up being announced by Grimshaw during another Radio 1 Breakfast Show on Monday 6 May. Both of the stages were in Ebrington Square - unlike recent Big Weekends there was no BBC Introducing Stage or Live Lounge Tent at this event. The '1Xtra' and 'In New Music We Trust' stages from Hackney 2012 were combined into a single venue.

Line-up

Due to issues at Heathrow Airport, two acts on the bill for Friday were unable to attend the event: those being Angel Haze and AlunaGeorge. Further acts also had their performances affected by the flight disruptions but were still able to appear: J. Cole was forced to substitute his band for a backing track, and Rudimental's equipment was stuck in London, forcing them to use the equipment of Chase and Status.
The above tables do not always represent the stage orders - for example, Two Door Cinema Club opened the Main Stage on Saturday, as opposed to The Saturdays, who in fact performed second on the day. Similarly, 30 Seconds To Mars opened the Main Stage on Sunday.

Headline sets

2014 
On 30 January, Nick Grimshaw, Rita Ora and Paolo Nutini announced that the 2014 event would be held in Glasgow to celebrate the 2014 Commonwealth Games. For the first time, the event took place in two different locations in the same city. The Friday night of the event was held in George Square and was dedicated to dance music. The remaining two days followed the traditional format of the Big Weekend and took place at Glasgow Green. Coldplay, Rita Ora, Paolo Nutini, Pharrell Williams and The 1975 performed. On 31 March, 60,000 weekend tickets for the event sold out in 30 minutes. The Main Stage lineup was announced on the Radio 1 Breakfast Show on 28 April 2014. It was announced that Katy Perry would headline on the Sunday night while One Direction and Kings of Leon would open the Main Stage on the Saturday and Sunday respectively. Local Scottish band Baby Stange performed on the BBC Introducing Stage.

Line-up

Headline sets
{{hidden
| headercss = background: #ccccff; font-size: 100%; width: 65%;
| contentcss = text-align: left; font-size: 100%; width: 75%;
| header = Coldplay
| content = 
"Paradise"
"Charlie Brown"
"Magic"
"Yellow"
"Clocks"
"Every Teardrop is a Waterfall"
"True Love"
"Viva la Vida"
"Oceans"
"A Sky Full of Stars"
Encore
"Fix You"
}}
{{hidden
| headercss = background: #ccccff; font-size: 100%; width: 65%;
| contentcss = text-align: left; font-size: 100%; width: 75%;
| header = Katy Perry
| content = 
"Roar"
"Part of Me"
"Wide Awake"
"Dark Horse"
"I Kissed a Girl"
"The One That Got Away" (with small excerpts of "Thinking of You")
"Unconditionally"
"Walking on Air"
"Teenage Dream"
"California Gurls"
"Birthday"
Encore
"Firework"
}}

2015

On 23 January, Nick Grimshaw announced on the Radio 1 Breakfast Show, that the 2015 event would be held at Earlham Park in Norwich, Norfolk, next to the University of East Anglia, taking place on Saturday 23 and Sunday 24 May. On 31 March, 50,000 tickets went on sale and sold out within 40 minutes. The full lineup for main stage and the INMWT tent was announced on 20 April, Muse headlined on the Saturday and Foo Fighters on the Sunday. The majority of acts for the BBC introducing stage were announced on 22 April with the remaining acts announced on 4 May.

Line-up

Due to their vocal cord operation, Sam Smith's performance on Sunday was cancelled and replaced by Catfish and the Bottlemen.

2016
The event was held in Powderham Castle, Kenton near Exeter on 28 and 29 May. Coldplay headlined the second and final night, with other acts performing including Bring Me the Horizon, Chase & Status, Ellie Goulding and Craig David. On 1 March, it was announced that The 1975 and Jake Bugg had been added to the lineup. Ticket information was announced on Monday 21 March. Tickets went on sale at 8am on Monday 4 April. As usual, the tickets themselves were free, but there was an £8.50 administration fee with each ticket. In 2016, 60% of the tickets were reserved for residents living in areas covered by Exeter City Council and Teignbridge district council. A further 35% went to residents in surrounding areas of Exeter, including those with any other Exeter (EX) and Torquay (TQ) postcodes and those with Truro (TR), Plymouth (PL), Taunton (TA) and Dorchester (DT) postcodes, whilst the remaining 5% of tickets were available to the rest of the UK. The full line-up was announced in April 2016.

Line-up

Controversies
Twenty One Pilots had their set cut short due to "safety concerns". Frontman Tyler Joseph climbed a mast whilst singing "Car Radio", which prompted BBC officials to appear and cut his microphone off, and ask bandmate Josh Dun to stop drumming. They could not continue with their set and had to leave the stage.

2017
For 2017, the event was held at Burton Constable Hall approximately 9 miles (14 km) north-east of Hull. The location was confirmed the morning of 23 January, acts confirmed include Kings of Leon, Little Mix and Stormzy. On 16 March 2017, it was announced Katy Perry will be headlining the Saturday night.

Line-up

Headline sets

2018
In order to take advantage of the absence of the Glastonbury Festival in 2018, 4 separate Big Weekends were held simultaneously between 25 and 28 May in four cities each in the UK's four countries. Stylized as "BBC Music's Biggest Weekend", events were held in Swansea (with a line-up curated by Radio 1), Coventry and Perth (both curated by Radio 2) and Belfast (curated by Radio 6 Music). Tickets sold out for the Swansea, Perth and Coventry Big Weekends.

Line-up

Belfast

Perth

Swansea

Coventry

2019 
On 27 February, Greg James announced on the Radio 1 Breakfast Show that the Big Weekend would be held in Stewart Park, Middlesbrough, England for 2019 with Miley Cyrus, The 1975, Little Mix, Mabel, Zara Larsson and Khalid performing. The daily capacity was 32,000.

Headline sets

{{hidden
| headercss = background: #ccccff; font-size: 100%; width: 65%;
| contentcss = text-align: left; font-size: 100%; width: 75%;
| header = The 1975
| content = 
"Give Yourself a Try"
"TooTimeTooTimeTooTime"
"Sincerity Is Scary"
"It's Not Living (If It's Not with You)"
"Love Me"
Robbers"
"I Like America & America Likes Me"
"Somebody Else"
"I Always Wanna Die (Sometimes)
Encore
Love It If We Made It"
"Chocolate"
"Sex"
"The Sound"
}}

2020s

2020
On 27 January, Greg James announced on the Radio 1 Breakfast Show that the Big Weekend would be returning to Camperdown Park in Dundee in 2020 with Dua Lipa and Harry Styles headlining. With Camperdown Park having previously hosted the Big Weekend in 2006, it would have been the first time the same venue hosted the event twice - and the second time the Big Weekend has visited the same city twice, after Derry in 2004 and 2013.

On 13 March 2020, it was announced that the Big Weekend had been cancelled due to the COVID-19 pandemic.

However, in late April 2020 it was announced that there would be a virtual version airing on Radio 1 on the weekend of Friday 22 - Sunday 24 May 2020. The new Big Weekend festival featured newly recorded mini sets from the artist's homes as well as re-airings of full sets from previous Big Weekend performers over four "virtual stages".

Artists in italics have recorded new performances for the 2020 Big Weekend.

2021
Due to the continuing pandemic, the 2021 edition of Big Weekend was again held virtually. As with 2020, the event included a mixture of newly recorded performances and archive sets from previous years. It was held on 29 and 30 May 2021.

Artists in italics recorded new performances for the 2021 Big Weekend.

Headline sets

BBC Introducing sets
"23, Never Me" - Dead Pony

2022 
In late 2021, it was revealed that Radio 1's Big Weekend would return in a live tradition for the first time in three years, with Coventry being the host city for this event on 27 to 29 May 2022. 

On 14th May 2022 & 16th March, Saturday’s & Sunday’s main stage line-up were retrospectively announced on the Radio One Breakfast show with Greg James whilst the Future Sounds was announced on Radio 1’s Future Sounds with Clara Amfo.

Headline sets

2023 
On 30 January 2023, Dundee was announced as the host city for the 2023 edition of Big Weekend alongside the initial line-up. Dundee is the first Scottish city to host the event twice.

References

External links

  

Free festivals
Rock festivals in the United Kingdom
BBC Radio 1
BBC Radio in Concert
2003 establishments in the United Kingdom
Radio festivals
Music festivals established in 2003